Netrin receptor UNC5A is a protein that in humans is encoded by the UNC5A gene.

UNC5A belongs to a family of netrin-1 (MIM 601614) receptors thought to mediate the chemorepulsive effect of netrin-1 on specific axons. For more information on UNC5 proteins, see UNC5C (MIM 603610).[supplied by OMIM]

Interactions 

UNC5A has been shown to interact with MAGED1.

References

Further reading